The Fountain of Virgin is installed in Mexico City's Alameda Central, in Mexico.

External links

 

Alameda Central
Fountains in Mexico
Outdoor sculptures in Mexico City
Sculptures of women in Mexico
Statues in Mexico City